A logical extreme is a useful, though sometimes fallacious, rhetorical device for the disputation of propositions. Quite simply, a logical extreme is the relevant statement of an extreme or even preposterous position that is nonetheless consistent with the proposition in question. Thus, in so far as the logically extreme position is both relevant and untenable, it has succeeded in calling the proposition into question, at least in its stated form.   An example is in Basil Liddell Hart's essay Armed Forces and the Art of War: Armies in The New Cambridge Modern History:

See also 

 Reductio ad absurdum

References

Logic